Harrison Street was a former Erie Railroad main line city on the western edge of the city of Passaic, New Jersey. Located at the grade crossing of Harrison Street near Clifton, the station was first/last when entering the city. Heading westbound, the next station was Clifton while the next station east was the downtown Passaic station. The Erie Railroad agreed with the city of Passaic to abandon the station depot at Harrison Street in June 1952 (along with the one at Prospect Street) due to low ridership. The station depot, built in 1913, suffered a small fire on July 25, 1952. Demolition of the building began within a week after the fire, though the process took less time due to the flames.

References

External links 
The Erie Lackawanna Main Lines

Former Erie Railroad stations
Railway stations closed in 1953
Former railway stations in New Jersey
Buildings and structures in Passaic, New Jersey
1953 disestablishments in New Jersey
Railway stations in Passaic County, New Jersey